In enzymology, an acetyl-CoA C-myristoyltransferase is an enzyme that catalyzes the chemical reaction

myristoyl-CoA + acetyl-CoA  3-oxopalmitoyl-CoA + CoA

Thus, the two substrates of this enzyme are myristoyl-CoA and acetyl-CoA, whereas its two products are 3-oxopalmitoyl-CoA and CoA.

This enzyme belongs to the family of transferases, specifically those acyltransferases transferring groups other than aminoacyl groups.  The systematic name of this enzyme class is myristoyl-CoA:acetyl-CoA C-myristoyltransferase.

References

External links 
 

EC 2.3.1
Enzymes of unknown structure